Woodlawn School is a private independent school in Mooresville, North Carolina in Iredell County, north of Davidson, North Carolina. Founded in 2002, it has 182 students in grades K through 12. The Head of School is Paul Zanowski, who joined Woodlawn's staff in 2019. Woodlawn was accredited in 2009 by the Southern Association of Colleges and Schools and the Southern Association of Independent Schools, and was re-accredited in 2014.

History 
Woodlawn School was founded in 2002, on a historic piece of property (Wood Lawn) in the burgeoning Lake Norman area. The historic planter's home was originally built in 1836 and is listed on the National Register of Historic Places. That home was renovated in 2003, named Stinson Hall in honor of its original owner and now serves as the school's administration building.  The school's first major building project, completed in 2008 at a cost of $2.8 million, was the construction of an upper school classroom building (Woods Hall) and a gymnasium/auditorium (known as the Red Barn). In 2010, a $1.1 million project was completed which provided 4 additional classrooms (Van Buren Hall) and a multipurpose room/kitchen (The Lodge). In 2016, the school completed construction on the Alumni Track and Field complex, which includes a certified 400-meter, eight-lane track, high jump pit, pole vault pit, two long jump pits, shot put area, and discus area. The interior of the track includes a natural grass soccer field built to NCAA standards.

Individual achievements 
2010 marked Woodlawn's first graduation ceremony. Despite its small size and young age, Woodlawn students have already qualified for prestigious awards (52 AP Scholars, 14 National Merit Commended Scholars, 1 National Merit Scholarship Winner, 1 National Achievement Scholarship Winner).

Academics 
The school year is divided into 3 trimesters, and students in grades 6–12 generally take five core courses (English, History, Math, Science, and Spanish) in addition to 2–3 enrichment courses. In upper school, 9 Advanced Placement (AP) courses are offered. The school's drama company, the Red Barn Players, performs two major productions each year.

Athletics 
Woodlawn is a member of the Southern Piedmont Athletic Association for Varsity and Middle School sports (cross country, soccer, volleyball, basketball, swimming, golf, tennis, and track & field). The school won its first NCISAA 1A state championship in Varsity Boys Cross Country in 2014 and claimed consecutive titles in 2015 and 2016. The Varsity Girls Cross Country team also won the NCISAA 1A state championship in 2015, along with the Varsity Girls Soccer team.

See also
A different Woodlawn School in Mebane, North Carolina, also listed on the National Register

References

External links 
 Woodlawn School's website

Private high schools in North Carolina
Private middle schools in North Carolina
Educational institutions established in 2002
Private elementary schools in North Carolina
School buildings on the National Register of Historic Places in North Carolina
Schools in Iredell County, North Carolina
2002 establishments in North Carolina
National Register of Historic Places in Iredell County, North Carolina